Cryofibrinogenemic purpura is a skin condition that manifests as painful purpura with slow healing ulcerations and edema of both feet during winter months.

See also
 Cryofibrinogenemia
 Skin lesion

References

Vascular-related cutaneous conditions